The 1940 Brooklyn Dodgers season was their 11th in the league. The team improved on their previous season's output of 4–6–1, winning eight games. They failed to qualify for the playoffs for the ninth consecutive season.

Schedule

Standings

References

Brooklyn Dodgers (NFL) seasons
Brooklyn Dodgers (NFL)
Brooklyn
1940s in Brooklyn
Flatbush, Brooklyn